The Incorporation is a period in Dutch history where the country was part of the First French Empire. This period lasted from July 9, 1810, until November 21, 1813.

History

Dissolution of the kingdom 
The Batavian Republic which existed from 1795 was made into a kingdom by Napoleon Bonaparte in 1806. He placed his younger brother Louis Bonaparte on the throne of the newly formed Kingdom of Holland. During his kingship Louis tried to maintain an independent course from his brother, but his brother grew tired of the military weakness of his brother. After the Walcheren Campaign in the summer of 1809 he summoned his brother to Paris and incorporated the island of Walcheren later that year. Next year, the Dutch territories south of the Rhine were added into the growing empire of Napoleon. With these sacrifices Louis Bonaparte hoped he could please his brother and he could remain king of this reduced kingdom.

Louis Napoleon abdicated and fled his kingdom on 2 July 1810. Immediately marshal Nicolas Oudinot took control of the capital of the kingdom, Amsterdam. A week later Napoleon officially incorporated the Kingdom of Holland into his empire. He gave the order to his confidant Charles-François Lebrun to oversee the transition of the French rule in the former kingdom as a Lieutenant General. After a few days Lebrun arrived in Amsterdam. In August 1810 a committee of 15 Dutch notables went to Paris to give the French government proposals for the efficiently integration of the Netherlands into the French Empire.

The Dutch departments 
In the Decree of Rambouillet of November 9, 1810, the official incorporation act, the structure of the Kingdom of Holland was largely kept intact. Louis Bonaparte's ministers stayed at their positions until 1811. The city of Amsterdam became the third capital of the First French Empire, after Paris and Rome. In the Dutch departments the French language became the official language. Napoleon also formed seven Dutch departments and at the top of the Dutch departments was the governor general: Lebrun. He was assisted with some intendants, ministers, for governing the Dutch departments.  was made intendant de l'interieur and Alexander Gogel became intendant des finances.

The introduction of imperial conscription in the former Kingdom of Holland in 1811 became the most unpopular measure of the government. The conscription led to civil unrest in different parts of the incorporated territories and it was the most sincere form of unrest during the Incorporation. Besides the conscription several other French institutions were introduced in the Netherlands. Civil marriage, status, the land registry and the chamber of commerce were all introduced during the Incorporation.

When Napoleon lost the Battle of Leipzig in the autumn of 1813, the Dutch departments were, a month later, invaded by Russian Cossacks and Prussian troops. Within weeks, the French administration in the Netherlands crumbled and Lebrun and the army fled to France. The Dutch politician Gijsbert Karel van Hogendorp issued a proclamation for the independence of the Netherlands and making an end to the Incorporation. The son of the last stadtholder, William Frederick, returned to the Netherlands to become the first sovereign of the country. After the Congress of Vienna, he became the first king of the Netherlands.

Military 
After Holland was incorporated in the French Empire the Dutch army also came under French authority. The Dutch regiments were reorganized to fit into the Napoleonic army. The incorporated area was divided into two military divisions (Divisions militaires). The troops in these divisions were responsible for the defense of the area they were stationed, maintaining public order and monitored compliance the laws of conscription and the continental system. The divisions were led by the French generals Pierre François Joseph Durutte and Gabriel Jean Joseph Molitor.

Government 
The government of the Dutch departments during the Incorporation consisted of:
Charles-François Lebrun, governor general
Alexander Gogel, intendant of finance
, intendant of the interior
, director of the treasury
, director of the Customs
, director of Public Debt
, director of the police

References 

First French Empire
Former polities in the Netherlands
1811 in the Netherlands
19th century in the Netherlands
Patriottentijd